is a Japanese record label founded in 1975.

Sub-divisions
Güt Records
Anri
Loversoul Music & Associates

Artists
Its artists include Yōsui Inoue, Abe Fuyumi, Takuro Yoshida, Shigeru Izumiya, Under Graph, Utaibito Hane, Yōsuke Eguchi, Double, The Hiatus, Tomoyo Harada, Shinji Harada, Yo Hitoto, Yann Tomita, Doopees, Bennie K, Chihiro Onitsuka, Miss Monday, Sayuri Sugawara and Glay.

See also
 List of record labels

References

External links
 Website 
 
 

Japanese independent record labels
Record labels established in 1975